The formerly undivided province of Misamis was represented in a Philippine national legislature as an at-large district in one occasion. Three delegates were appointed to represent the province in the National Assembly of the First Philippine Republic in 1898. After the province was reorganized under U.S. civilian rule in 1901, two districts were created for Misamis ahead of the elections for the first fully elected Philippine Assembly in 1907.

Representation history

See also
Legislative districts of Misamis Occidental
Legislative districts of Misamis Oriental

References

Former congressional districts of the Philippines
Politics of Misamis Occidental
Politics of Misamis Oriental
1898 establishments in the Philippines
1901 disestablishments in the Philippines
At-large congressional districts of the Philippines